The Antonov An-72 (NATO reporting name: Coaler) is a Soviet/Ukrainian transport aircraft, developed by Antonov. It was designed as an STOL transport and intended as a replacement for the Antonov An-26, but variants have found success as commercial freighters.

The An-72 and the related An-74 get their nickname, Cheburashka, from the large engine intake ducts, which resemble the oversized ears of the popular Soviet animated character of the same name.

Design and development

Produced in tandem with the An-72, the An-74 variant adds the ability to operate in harsh weather conditions in polar regions, because it can be fitted with wheel-skis landing gear, de-icing equipment, and a number of other upgrades, allowing the aircraft to support operations in Arctic or Antarctic environments. Other An-72 versions include the An-72S VIP transport and An-72P maritime patrol aircraft.

The powerplant used is the Lotarev D-36 turbofan engine. The An-72 resembles the unsuccessful Boeing YC-14, a prototype design from the early 1970s (design submitted to the United States Air Force in February 1972,) which had also used overwing engines and the Coandă effect.

The rear fuselage of the aircraft has a hinged loading ramp with a rear fairing that slides backwards and up to clear the opening. Up to  can be airdropped while it has folding side seats for 52 passengers.

In 2018, six An-72 aircraft were reported to be upgraded for the Russian Aerospace Forces and Navy to carry more fuel and payload for Arctic operations.

Operation
This aircraft was designed to be used on unprepared surfaces; its robust undercarriage and high-flotation tyres allow operations on sand, grass, or other unpaved surfaces.

Variants

 An-71 "Madcap": Prototype AWACS aircraft developed from the An-72.
 An-72 "Coaler-A": Preproduction aircraft. Two flying prototypes, one static test airframe and eight preproduction machines.
 An-72A "Coaler-C": Initial production STOL transport with a longer fuselage and increased wingspan.
 An-72AT – "Coaler-C": Freight version of the An-72A compatible with standard international shipping containers.
 An-72S – "Coaler-C": Executive VIP transport fitted with a galley in a front cabin, work and rest areas in a central cabin, and 24 armchairs in a rear cabin, can also be reconfigured for transporting freight or 38 passengers or as an air ambulance carrying eight stretchers.
 An-72P: Patrol aircraft. Armed with one  GSh-23L cannon plus bombs and/or rockets.
 An-72R (also known as An-72BR): Prototype electronic intelligence (ELINT) aircraft, with conformal antenna fairings running up each side of the fuselage. Known as 'Aircraft 88' during development and erroneously known as An-88.
 An-72-100: Demilitarized An-72.
 An-72-100D: Demilitarized An-72S.
 An-74: Arctic/Antarctic support model with room for five crew, increased fuel capacity, larger radar in bulged nose radome, improved navigation equipment, better de-icing equipment, and can be fitted with wheel-skis landing gear.

Operators

Civilian operators
In August 2006, in total, 51 An-72 and Antonov An-74 aircraft were in airline service. The major operators include Badr Airlines (three), and Shar Ink (eight). Some 17 other airlines operate fewer of the type.

 Badr Airlines
 Green Flag Airlines

 Motor Sich Airlines
 Antonov Airlines

Military operators
As of December 2021, 45 aircraft are in military service:

 Angolan Air Force: 6

 Air Force of the Democratic Republic of the Congo: 1

 Kazakhstan Air Force: 1

 Libyan Air Force: 1

 Russian Air Force: 31
 Russian Navy: 5

 Ukrainian National Guard:At least 2

Former military operators

 Armenian Air Force

 Armed Forces of Equatorial Guinea

 Georgian Air Force

 Libyan Air Force

 Moldovan Air Force: Two

 Peruvian Air Force – two (operated until late 1990s and sold to civilian market)

 Soviet Air Force

Accidents and incidents
, there have been 24 known accidents and incidents involving the An-72 or An-74; of these, the following involved fatalities:
 CCCP-74002 attempted to take off from Lensk Airport overloaded with fish. All 13 human occupants died when it crashed  from the airport.
 An Antonov An-72 chase plane had a mid-air collision while following the Antonov An-70 prototype aircraft during a test flight. The collision caused the An-70 to crash into a forested area, killing all seven An-70 crew members. The An-72 lost a right wing flap, but it was able to return to base safely.
 ER-ACF, an Antonov An-72 disappeared on a cargo flight from Port Bouet Airport, Côte d'Ivoire to Rundu Airport, Namibia. The aircraft and its five crew members disappeared without a trace over the South Atlantic. The cause of the incident remains undetermined.
 UR-74038 carrying food aid to Chad from Libya crashed in Cameroon, killing all 6 crew.
 An Islamic Revolutionary Guard Corps Air Force An-72 crashed after takeoff from Mehrabad International Airport in Tehran, killing 37 of the 38 aboard.
 An An-72 carrying Kazakhstani border patrol officials crashed in Shymkent, killing all 27 people on board.
 An An-72 operated for the DRC Air Force with 4 crew and 4 passengers crashed in Congo; none survived.

Specifications (An-72)

See also

References

Notes

External links

 An-72/An-74 Family (Data for An-72A & List of all known An-72/An-74 Family variants )
 An-74 Pictures
 AN-74TK-300 modification at Antonov's site
 AN-74T modification at Antonov's site
 AN-74T-200A INFO
 AN-74TK-300D INFO
 
 An-71 Article, Images
 An-71 Specs at globalsecurity.org

1970s Soviet cargo aircraft
1970s Soviet military transport aircraft
Aircraft first flown in 1977
An-072
Engine-over-wing aircraft
T-tail aircraft
Twinjets